Wabash is an unincorporated community in Mercer County, in the U.S. state of Ohio.

History
A post office called Wabash was established in 1881, and remained in operation until 1904. Besides the post office, Wabash had a church, country store, and school.

References

Unincorporated communities in Mercer County, Ohio
Unincorporated communities in Ohio